G. Christhudhas became the fourth Bishop of Kanyakumari of the Church of South India (CSI) in 1980; and served until 1997.

References

Living people
Year of birth missing (living people)
20th-century Anglican bishops
Anglican bishops of Kanyakumari
Indian Christian religious leaders